Rutherford "Rud" Lester Whiting (July 30, 1930 – February 13, 2014) was a Canadian politician, who was the Liberal Member of Parliament for the riding of Halton from 1968 until 1972.

Political career
When Harry Harley, Halton's incumbent MP, decided not to stand for reelection in the 1968 general election, Whiting (who was already on the riding party executive) decided to contest the party nomination, and eventually won by two votes over Oakville Mayor MacLean Anderson on the fourth ballot. He became MP in the subsequent election.

He was defeated by Terry O'Connor of the Progressive Conservative Party of Canada in the 1972 general election.

In 1985, Whiting attempted to reenter politics at the local level by campaigning for a Regional Councillor seat for Ward 4 in Halton Hills, but was defeated by the incumbent Marilyn Sarjeantson.

Whiting was later a marketing manager for a land developer, and subsequently became a real estate agent.

Electoral record

References

External links

 Photo of Rud Whiting at Milton Images
 

1930 births
2014 deaths
Anglophone Quebec people
Liberal Party of Canada MPs
Members of the House of Commons of Canada from Ontario
Politicians from Montreal